The Emmanuel Franz House is an Italianate style Victorian historical residence located within downtown Ventura, in coastal Ventura County, California.

The wood and brick Franz House was built from 1879 to 1891. The house has an interesting front stoop and widow's watch.

The City Council of Ventura designated this building Historic Landmark Number 21 by resolution on March 29, 1976. The house  was listed in 1982 on the National Register of Historic Places.

See also
 City of Ventura Historic Landmarks and Districts
National Register of Historic Places listings in Ventura County, California

References

External links

City of Ventura. "City Landmarks, Points of Interest, and Historic Districts". Historic Preservation in Ventura webpage. 
City of Ventura. "City Map" (searchable GIS). 
National Register of Historic Places Travel Itinerary: "Early History of the California Coast"

Houses in Ventura County, California
Buildings and structures in Ventura, California
Houses completed in 1891
Houses on the National Register of Historic Places in California
National Register of Historic Places in Ventura, California
Italianate architecture in California
Victorian architecture in California